Iisakki Elias Nikkola (11 May 1887 – 20 January 1959) was a Finnish farmer and politician, born in Kurikka. He was a member of the Parliament of Finland as a representative of the Patriotic People's Movement (IKL) from 1933 to 1944, as an Independent from 1944 to 1945 (after the IKL was banned on 23 September 1944) and as a representative of the National Coalition Party from 1951 to 1952.

References

1887 births
1959 deaths
People from Kurikka
People from Vaasa Province (Grand Duchy of Finland)
Patriotic People's Movement (Finland) politicians
National Coalition Party politicians
Members of the Parliament of Finland (1933–36)
Members of the Parliament of Finland (1936–39)
Members of the Parliament of Finland (1939–45)
Members of the Parliament of Finland (1951–54)
Finnish people of World War II
Finnish farmers
Finnish fascists